Betta albimarginata is a species of betta fish, endemic to the island of Borneo where it is only found in the Indonesian province of Kalimantan Timur. It inhabits the shallows of forest streams amongst vegetation and debris along the shores. It is a mouthbrooding species.

References

albimarginata
Taxa named by Maurice Kottelat
Fish described in 1994